Carel Johannes Delport is a South African mass murderer who killed nine people and wounded 19 others in the Ladysmith, KwaZulu-Natal area on January 20, 1992. Delport was subsequently arrested and sentenced to 39 years in prison.

Life
Carel Johannes Delport was born in 1956 and known by his nickname, "Kallie", and as a child suffered from meningitis. Delport was declared unfit for military service for unknown reasons, and instead worked on the farm of his father, Marthiens Delport, earning 300 South African Rand a month. The farm was located in Allerkraal, a place outside of the city of Ladysmith. Delport reportedly had a history of mental illness and was twice charged with and acquitted of manslaughter after shooting two cattle thieves. His family had repeatedly asked his father to not allow him to own any firearms, but he declined their requests. Delport had 13 licensed firearms at the time of the shooting and was frequently asked by locals to participate in wildlife culling, because he was considered one of the best marksmen in the area.

According to an examination conducted after the shooting, Delport had an IQ of 78 and was suffering from borderline personality disorder.

Family
Delport had his father Marthiens, a brother named Willem, and a stepmother Eleonora. Delport had called his father a "hard and ruthless man" and accused of "casting him from his rightful place" when Marthiens had adopted a black boy two months prior to the shooting. Marthiens Delport had fathered an illegitimate daughter with a black woman, and once raped a 16-year-old relative, who afterwards unsuccessfully tried to commit suicide. Delport also had constant disputes with his stepmother, who struggled to tolerate his presence on the farm and wanted him to leave. According to Delport, his father often said that he was stupid and belonged in a mental institution, and was also not allowed to eat together with his father and stepmother at the table, instead had to have his meals outside the house.

Shooting
The shooting began at the farm in Allerkraal after Delport had an argument with his father about the sale of three calves, and when his father showed him the money he had just received, commenting that he would give it to his stepmother, Delport armed himself with a .357 Magnum revolver. Delport killed his father with a shot to the chest on the veranda, then attempted to help him but he was already dead. Delport next shot the farm's housemaid, Makhozana Alzina Ntombela, in the kitchen and set fire to the mattress in his room and his car, which eventually caused the house to burn down. Outside, about 750 metres from the farm, Delport killed Msamaniso Mdladla and Petros Ndlala, the two black men who had come to buy the calves, and then drove to his stepmother's home in Ladysmith to set her car on fire, but when he failed to find it, he began shooting randomly at people in the street with a Ruger Mini-14.

Delport continued shooting at the parking lot of a shopping centre, killing a total of five people, including traffic officer Prithlal Rambally, who was hit three times, and wounding 11 more. When police arrived at the scene he sped away in his truck towards Newcastle and shot at commuters in a bus, wounding six of them. Delport was eventually arrested on a road outside of Ladysmith, after a short chase and a shootout with police, in which two officers were wounded. Besides the rifle, police recovered four 30-round magazines, the .357 Magnum revolver and more than 3,600 rounds of ammunition from Delport's truck. Most of his victims were killed with shots to the heart.

Victims
Those killed were:

Marthiens Delport, 68, Delport's father
Makhozana Alzina Ntombela, 40, housemaid at the Delport farm 
Msamaniso Mdladla, killed at the farm 
Petros Ndlala, killed at the farm 
Melusi Obed Zwane
Mohamed Faruk Laka
Enock Lucky Nyatahi
Patrick Mbongeni Gumede 
Prithlal Rambally, 28, traffic officer

Aftermath
Most of Delport's victims were black, causing racial tensions to be increased in the area, and during his trial a crowd gathered outside the court and threatened to lynch him.

On March 4 the trial was postponed to March 18 for a two-week-long psychiatric examination of the gunman. Dr. Anthony Dunn, chief psychiatrist at the Midlands Hospital, argued that Delport was not mentally ill during the shooting, but due to his low IQ, his inability to cope with stress, and his hatred against his father he was of partially unsound mind and lost all self-control. Prosecution accepted his mental incapacity, low intelligence and emotional imbalance to be mitigating factors and refrained from demanding capital punishment, instead asking for a long-term prison sentence during which Delport should receive psychological help.

Delport pleaded not guilty, claiming that he was of unsound mind during the shooting and fired at black shapes that were attacking him. On October 21 he was found guilty after changing his plea, and on October 29 he was sentenced to a total of 39 years in prison, among them 22 years for nine counts of murder, and 12 years for 21 counts of attempted murder. The sentences run concurrently, meaning that he will be released after 22 years. Delport was also declared unfit to ever be able to obtain a firearms license.

See also
Barend Strydom

References

South African mass murderers
South African arsonists
1992 in South Africa
Deaths by firearm in South Africa
Murder in South Africa
Mass murder in 1992
South African people convicted of murder
Patricides
1950s births
Living people
South African spree killers